Viesturs Bērziņš (born 9 April 1974) is a Latvian cyclist. He competed at the 1996 Summer Olympics and the 2000 Summer Olympics.

References

1974 births
Living people
Latvian male cyclists
Olympic cyclists of Latvia
Cyclists at the 1996 Summer Olympics
Cyclists at the 2000 Summer Olympics
Sportspeople from Riga